Stjepan Freiherr Sarkotić von Lovćen (also Stefan Sarkotić, Stjepan Sarkotić, or Stephan Sarkotić; 4 October 1858 – 16 October 1939) was an Austro-Hungarian Army generaloberst of Croatian descent who served as Governor of Bosnia and Herzegovina and military commander of Dalmatia and Montenegro during the First World War.

Early life and education 
Stjepan Sarkotić was born in Sinac near the Croatian town of Otočac on 4 October 1858 as one of four siblings. His father was Lieutenant Matija Sarkotić of the Otočac Border Regiment Nr.2. After he attended gymnasium in Senj, he entered in Military School in Sankt Pölten, and later he attended Theresian Military Academy in Wiener Neustadt.

Military career 
In 1884 he got his first military post in the Königgrätz Regiment, and later he was transferred to 16th Infantry Regiment in Trebinje, Herzegovina. In 1886, he was stationed in Mostar in the 1. Mountain Brigade. Until 1887 he was involved in military actions that occurred in Bosnia and Herzegovina and in Krivošije in Montenegro. By 1889 he was promoted to the rank of captain and assigned to the General Staff Corps in Vienna.  He was hereafter assigned to obtain intelligence on foreign nations. To this end he travelled abroad to Serbia, Bulgaria and Macedonia, Russian city Kazan, where he learned to speak Russian. After his return, he worked in Intelligence Service of General Staff, and after that he worked with troops in the field.
As soon as he became major, he was assigned to be commander of staff of the 7th Infantry Division in Osijek, where he remained for four years. After that, he was assigned to Regiment in Prague as lieutenant colonel. Between 1900 and 1903 he was chief of Staff at the port city of Pula during which time he became colonel in 1901. After his service in Pula, he was assigned to be commander of the staff of XII Corps in Sibiu in Transilvania. In 1907 he became commander of the 5th Infantry Brigade in Linz, and in the same year he was promoted to major general. In 1908 he became commander of the 88th Lands Rifle Regiment, and in 1910 he was assigned to be a commander of 44th Home Guard Division. On 2 November 1911 he was promoted to feldmarschalleutnant. Emperor Franz Joseph appointed him to the nobility in 1908.
On 10 April 1912 Sarkotić became general of the VI Royal Hungarian Honvéd District, succeeding his countryman Svetozar Boroević in this post. Sarkotić was also commander of the Home Guard of the Kingdom of Croatia-Slavonia with headquarters in Zagreb.

First World War 

Military governor of occupied Serbian territories
On 24 November 1914, after a third attempt, Austro-Hungarian troops finally captured Belgrade, General Sarkotić is appointed military governor of the occupied Serbian territory by Emperor Franz Joseph; General Johann von Salis-Seewis took over command of the 42nd Division. On 2 December, the Royal Serbian Army launched an unexpected sustained counterattack, decisively defeating the Austro-Hungarians at the Battle of Kolubara and recapturing Belgrade just a day after the establishment of Stjepan Sarkotic’s new military government, effectively ending his brief governorship and bringing the first Austro-Hungarian Serbian Campaign to an end.

Governor of Bosnia and Herzegovina
On 22 December 1914, he replaced as Governor of Bosnia and Herzegovina Oskar Potiorek who had been commander of the Balkanstreitkräfte (Balkan Armed Forces) during the failed campaign. He was decorated with Order of the Iron Crown 2nd Class. At the same time, he was named commander of 15th and 16th division, and promoted to the rank of a general of infantry. With this appointment, Sarkotić held both military and civil power in Bosnia and Herzegovina. As governor of Bosnia and Herzegovina he understood the need for reforms in the region by both Austria and Hungary due to what he saw as the danger of a Yugoslav state. Sarkotić formally dissolved the Diet of Bosnia in February 1915. The last time the Diet convened until then was 29 June 1914.

Montenegrin campaign

In 1916 Sarkotić commanded the Western wing of the campaign into Montenegro from the naval base in Kotor. His troops attacked the Montenegrin forces at Mount Lovćen. Within two days his forces took Lovćen and three days after that the Montenegrin capital, Cetinje, was also under their control. For the success of this operation, Sarkotić was awarded the Order of Leopold First Class with War Decoration and Swords and the Bronze Military Merit Medal with Swords. He was also made a Hungarian baron, accepting the style of von Lovćen, and was afterwards officially styled Stefan Baron Sarkotić von Lovćen at the Austrian court.  Although his title of baron was Hungarian, Sarkotić was often referred to as Freiherr Sarkotić von Lovćen in German.

End of war
In 1917 he was promoted to Generaloberst (Colonel General). He continued at his position in Bosnia and Herzegovina until 1918.  Sarkotić was strongly anti-Serbian and anti-Yugoslav. During his tenure as governor of Bosnia and Herzegovina he suggested the unification of Croatia-Slavonia with Dalmatia and Bosnia and Herzegovina. However, Austria-Hungary's political elite never took the threat of a South Slav state very seriously. István Tisza, Prime Minister of Hungary suggested a plebiscite be held, but the actions were too little too late. On Sarkotić's recommendation Tisza met with Ivo Pilar and Josip Vancaš, anti-Yugoslav members of the Croat People's Union in the Diet of Bosnia and Herzegovina, during his visit to Sarajevo in September 1918. 

After the defeat and the dissolution of the Dual Monarchy, Sarkotić was incarcerated by officials from the newly proclaimed Kingdom of Serbs, Croats and Slovenes, along with other conspirators, after it was found that he was trying to start an insurrection in the Yugoslav army. Sarkotić was held for ten days then released on the condition that he left Yugoslavia immediately.

Emigration 

After his release he returned to Vienna. Here he was involved with Croatian émigré groups. He frequently wrote against the ruling Serb Karađorđević dynasty in the Austrian Reichspost. He also formed and was head of a group known as the Croatian Committee. Even though at the beginning, Croat émigrés were united, they divided later into two groups, one being the legitimists, led by Sarkotić and Stjepan Duić, and the republicans, led by Ivo Frank. The legitimists, mostly former Austrian-Hungarian officers, supported re-unification of Austria-Hungary. Sarkotić considered that Croats were endangered in Yugoslavia because of strong Serbian nationalism and huge influence of the Serbian Orthodox Church. However, since there were no sympathies for the old Austrian-Hungarian Monarchy amongst Croats, the Committee had little influence in Croatia.
 

In 1932, fascist Croat nationalist Ante Pavelić founded the Ustaša – Croatian Revolutionary Movement in Italy with an important base in Austria. Pavelić's terrorist organization overshadowed Sarkotić's Committee both numerically and with fanaticism, which led to eventual diminishing of Sarkotić's influence amongst the Croatian émigrés. On 9 October 1934, a joint Ustaše-IMRO conspiracy led to the assassination of King Alexander I of Yugoslavia. Sarkotić did not return to the land of his birth and died in Vienna in 1939.

Notes

References

Books

Papers

External links

 Stephan Baron Sarkotić von Lovčen

Croatian military personnel in Austrian armies
People from Otočac
Barons of Croatia
Austro-Hungarian military personnel of World War I
Croatian people of World War I
Croatian Austro-Hungarians
1858 births
1939 deaths
19th-century Croatian military personnel
20th-century Croatian military personnel
Barons of Austria
Austro-Hungarian Army officers
Governors of Bosnia and Herzegovina
Royal Croatian Home Guard
Monarchists
Theresian Military Academy alumni